Kaori Inoue (井上香織 Inoue Kaori, born October 21, 1982) is retired a Japanese volleyball player who plays for Denso Airybees.  On the 23 September 2008 Airybees announced her marriage. She serves as the captain of the team from 2009.  She was part of the Japanese team that won the bronze medal at the 2012 Summer Olympics. Her retirement was announced in 2015.

Clubs
Hikami High School → Denso Airybees (2001-)

Awards

Individuals
2007 2006-07 V.Premier.League Block awards, Best 6 awards
2008 2007-08 V.Premier.League Best 6 awards
2008 Kurowashiki All Japan Volleyball Championship Most Valuable Player

Team
2008 2007-08 Japan Volleyball League/V.League/V.Premier -  Runner-up, with Denso.
2008 57th Kurowashiki All Japan Volleyball Championship -  Champion, with Denso.
2010 Empress's Cup -  Champion, with Denso.

National team
2009 Asian Championship -  Bronze medal
2010 World Championship -  Bronze medal
2012 Olympics -  Bronze medal

References

External links
FIVB Biography
Denso Official Website Profile

Living people
1982 births
Olympic volleyball players of Japan
Volleyball players at the 2012 Summer Olympics
Olympic bronze medalists for Japan
Olympic medalists in volleyball
Japanese women's volleyball players
Medalists at the 2012 Summer Olympics
21st-century Japanese women